Somanathapura is a temple town popular for Chennakeshava Temple in Mysore, Karnataka, India. It may also refer to the following places:

Karnataka 
 Somanathapura, a village in Tirumakudal - Narsipur Taluk, Mysore district
Chennakeshava Temple, Somanathapura
 Somanathapura, Mandya, a village in Krishnarajpet Taluk, Mandya district
 Somanathapura, Chikkaballapur, a village in Bagepalli Taluk, Chikkaballapura district
 Somanathapura, Channapatna, a village in Channapatna Taluk, Ramanagara district
 Somanathapura, Kanakapura, a village in Kanakapura Taluk, Ramanagara district
 Somnathahalli, Gulbarga, a village in Gulbarga Taluk, Gulbarga district
 Somnathahalli, Jewargi, a village in Jewargi Taluk, Gulbarga district
 Somnathanahalli, Hassan, a village in Channarayapatna Taluk, Hassan district

Tamil Nadu 
 Somanathapuram, a town in Kallakkurichi Taluk, Viluppuram district

Orissa 
 Somanathapur, Begunia, a village in Begunia Taluk, Khordha district
 Somanathapur, Khordha, a village in Khordha Sadar Taluk, Khordha district
 Somanathapur, Puri, a village in Kakatpur Taluk, Puri district
 Somanathapur, Ganjam, a village in Jarada Taluk, Ganjam district

See also 
 Chennakeshava Temple (disambiguation)